The discography of Eddy Lover, a Panamanian reggaeton and Reggae en Español artist, consists of two studio albums and four singles (including all singles from studio, compilation albums and collaborations with other singers).

On August 12, 2008, Lover released his debut album Perdóname including the singles "Luna", "No Debiste Volver" and "Baby Cuéntale".

Albums

Studio

EPs

Singles

Solo

As featured performer

References

Discographies of American artists
Reggaeton discographies